Macroglossum sylvia, the obscure hummingbird hawkmoth, is a moth of the family Sphingidae. It is known from Sri Lanka, India, Thailand, southern China, Taiwan, Vietnam, Malaysia (Peninsular, Sarawak, Sabah), Indonesia (Sumatra, Java, Kalimantan, Sulawesi, Maluku) and the Philippines.

The wingspan is 60–66 mm.

References

Macroglossum
Moths described in 1875